Saint-Pierre-la-Bourlhonne (Auvergnat: Sent Pèire de la Borlhona) is a commune in the Puy-de-Dôme département in Auvergne in central France.

See also
Communes of the Puy-de-Dôme department

References

Saintpierrelabourlhonne